is a mail artist. He was responsible for the Brain Cell mail art project, which he began in June 1985 and retains thousands of members in more than 80 countries, e.g. Hans Braumüller, Theo Breuer, Michael Leigh or Litsa Spathi. In August 2001 he began the Fractal Portrait Project. He has taught art to school children for more than 25 years.

Cohen discovered mail art through the Canadian artist Byron Black. Early work by Cohen is a mixture of traditional Japanese imagery, contemporary icons, and numbers, as well as his signature, the letter "C".

In 1997 Guy Bleus organised a solo exhibition of Cohen's mail art work at the E-Mail Art Archives in the Centre for Visual Arts (now Z33) in Hasselt (Belgium).

Cohen's family name is conventionally romanized as Kōen, but on the advice of a friend, he adopted the English spelling 'Cohen'. He is not a Kohen.

References

External links
Archivio Conz
Ryosuke Cohen Home Page
Fractal Portrait Project
Animals in Mail Art
Ryosuke Cohen and the Brain Cell Project
Brain Cell Compilation

1948 births
Living people
Japanese contemporary artists
People from Osaka Prefecture